The Government of Malaysia, officially the Federal Government of Malaysia, is based in the Federal Territory of Putrajaya,  with the exception of the legislative branch, which is located in Kuala Lumpur. Malaysia is a federation comprising the 11 States of Malaya, the Borneo States of Sabah and Sarawak, and 3 Federal Territories operating within a constitutional monarchy under the Westminster system and is categorised as a representative democracy. The federal government of Malaysia adheres to and is created by the Federal Constitution of Malaysia, the supreme law of the land.

The federal government adopts the principle of separation of powers under Article 127 of the Federal Constitution of Malaysia, and has three branches: the executive, legislature, and judiciary. The state governments in Malaysia also have their respective executive and legislative bodies. The judicial system in Malaysia is a federalised court system operating uniformly throughout the country.

Federal government

The federal or central government is the ultimate authority in Malaysia and located in Putrajaya. It is headed by the Prime Minister of Malaysia who is also known as the head of government.

Legislature

The bicameral parliament consists of the lower house, the House of Representatives or Dewan Rakyat (literally the "Chamber of the People") and the upper house, the Senate or Dewan Negara (literally the "Chamber of the Nation"). All seventy Senate members sit for three-year terms (to a maximum of two terms); twenty-six are elected by the thirteen state assemblies, and forty-four are appointed by the King (Yang di-Pertuan Agong) based on the advice of the Prime Minister. The 222 members of the Dewan Rakyat are elected from single-member districts by universal suffrage. The parliament follows a multi-party system and the governing body is elected through a first-past-the-post voting system. Parliament has a maximum mandate of five years by law. The Yang di-Pertuan Agong may dissolve parliament at any time and usually does so upon the advice of the Prime Minister.

Executive

While the Monarch is the head of state, real executive power is vested in the cabinet, led by the prime minister as the head of government; the Malaysian constitution stipulates that the prime minister must be a member of the lower house of parliament who, in the opinion of the Yang di-Pertuan Agong, commands a majority in parliament. The cabinet is chosen from among members of both houses of Parliament and is responsible to that body.

The Executive branch of the Government of Malaysia consists of the Prime Minister as the head of the government, followed by the various ministers of the Cabinet.

Judiciary

The highest court in the judicial system is the Federal Court, followed by the Court of Appeal, and two High Courts, one for Peninsular Malaysia, and one for East Malaysia. The subordinate courts in each of these jurisdictions include Sessions Courts, Magistrates' Courts, and Courts for Children. Malaysia also has a Special Court to hear cases brought by or against all Royalty.

Head of state

The Yang di-Pertuan Agong, also known as the Supreme Head or the King, is the constitutional monarch and head of state of Malaysia. The office was established in 1957, when the Federation of Malaya (now Malaysia) gained independence from the United Kingdom. The Yang di-Pertuan Agong is elected by the Conference of Rulers, comprising the nine rulers of the Malay states, with the office de facto rotated between them, making Malaysia one of the world's few elective monarchies. In accordance with Article 41 of the Constitution, the Yang di-Pertuan Agong is Commander-in-Chief of the Malaysian Armed Forces. As such, he is the highest-ranking officer in the military chain of command.

Head of government

The Prime Minister of Malaysia (Malay: Perdana Menteri Malaysia) is the indirect head of government (executive) of Malaysia. The Prime Minister is appointed by the Yang di-Pertuan Agong, the head of state, who in His Majesty's judgment is likely to command the confidence of the majority of the members of that House of Representatives (Dewan Rakyat), the elected lower house of Parliament. The Prime Minister heads the Cabinet, whose members are appointed by the Yang di-Pertuan Agong, on the advice of the prime minister. The Prime Minister and his Cabinet shall be collectively responsible to Parliament. The Prime Minister's Department (sometimes referred to as the Prime Minister's Office) is the body and ministry in which the Prime Minister exercises their functions and powers.

State governments

Each state government in Malaysia is created by its respective state constitution. Each state has a unicameral state legislative chamber (Malay: Dewan Undangan Negeri) whose members are elected from single-member constituencies. State executive councils (abbr. EXCO) of states of Malaya, Cabinet of Sabah and Cabinet of Sarawak are led by Menteri Besar or Chief Ministers in states without hereditary rulers, who are state assembly members from the majority party in the state legislative chamber. They advise their respective sultans or governors. In each of the states with a hereditary ruler, the Menteri Besar is required to be a Malay, appointed by the Sultan.

Local governments

The local government or local authority (Malay: kerajaan tempatan or pihak berkuasa tempatan (PBT)) is the lowest level in the system of government in Malaysia—after federal and state. It has the power to collect taxes (in the form of assessment tax), to create laws and rules (in the form of by-laws) and to grant licenses and permits for any trade in its area of jurisdiction, in addition to providing basic amenities, collecting and managing waste and garbage as well as planning and developing the area under its jurisdiction. Local authorities in Malaysia are generally under the exclusive purview of the state governments and headed by a civil servant with the title Yang Di-Pertua (President). Local government areas and the boundaries is usually consistent with district boundaries but there are some places where the boundaries are not consistent and may overlap with adjoining districts especially in urbanised areas.

Unlike the federal and state governments, the local governments in Malaysia are not elected but appointed by the state government after local council elections were suspended by the federal government in 1965.

Military, police and other governmental bodies

The Malaysian Armed Forces are the military body of Malaysia while the Royal Malaysia Police are in charge of law enforcement.

Legal system

The law of Malaysia is mainly based on the common law legal system. This was a direct result of the colonisation of Malaya, Sarawak, and North Borneo by Britain between the early 19th century to 1960s. The supreme law of the land—the Constitution of Malaysia—sets out the legal framework and rights of Malaysian citizens. Federal laws enacted by the Parliament of Malaysia apply throughout the country. There are also state laws enacted by the State Legislative Assemblies which applies in the particular state. The constitution of Malaysia also provides for a unique dual justice system—the secular laws (criminal and civil) and sharia laws.

Articles 73 to 79 of the Federal Constitution specifies the subject in which the federal and state government may legislate. Parliament has the exclusive power to make laws over matters falling under the Federal List (such as citizenship, defence, internal security, civil and criminal law, finance, trade, commerce and industry, education, labour, and tourism) whereas each State, through its Legislative Assembly, has legislative power over matters under the State List (such as land, local government, Syariah law and Syariah courts, State holidays and State public works). Parliament and State legislatures share the power to make laws over matters under the Concurrent List (such as water supplies and housing) but Article 75 provides that in the event of conflict, Federal law will prevail over State law.

Elections

Elections in Malaysia exist at two levels: national level and state level. National level elections are those for membership in the Dewan Rakyat, the lower house of Parliament, while state level elections are for membership in the various State Legislative Assemblies. The head of the executive branch, the Prime Minister, is appointed among members of the winning coalition.

See also
 Politics of Malaysia
 Cabinet of Malaysia
 Prime Minister of Malaysia
 Deputy Prime Minister of Malaysia
 Chief Secretary to the Government of Malaysia
 List of federal ministries and agencies in Malaysia

References

External links
 Government of Malaysia portal

 
Asian governments